Of Cabbages and Kings may refer to

Of Cabbages and Kings (album), 1967 album by English folk rock duo Chad & Jeremy
Of Cabbages and Kings (band), an American noise rock band from Chicago, Illinois, formed in 1985
Of Cabbages and Kings (EP), 1987 eponymous EP

See also
Cabbages and Kings (disambiguation)